Naviera Armas is a Spanish company, founded in the 1940s, which operates a number of ferry services in Spain. The company mainly operates in the Canary Islands, with additional routes connecting the Canary Islands and the north African coast to the Spanish mainland. As of August 2019, the company operates a fleet of 11 ferries and 5 fast ferries.

History
Naviera Armas was founded in 1941 in Lanzarote by Antonio Armas Curbelo. Its initial activities were dedicated to the inter-island transport of salt and freight using wooden-hull boats. With the years, the company included steel-hull ships in its fleet and expanded to the old province of Spanish Sahara.

In 1975, the company introduced the first roll-on/roll-off vessels in the Canary Islands. However, it was not until 1995 that the company began to offer passenger services.

2003 saw the beginning of a fleet renewal plan with the arrival of the Volcán de Tindaya.

In 2008, the company started offering services to Portimão, Portugal with a stopover on the Portuguese island of Madeira. However, in 2013, the service to Madeira was abruptly withdrawn due to a dispute over harbour fees. Services resumed in the summer of 2018 as a seasonal offering between 2 July and 20 September, being operated by Grupo Sousa using Naviera Armas's ship Volcán de Tijarafe, which provided the crossing prior to the 2013 discontinuation. With a maximum speed of 23 knots, the crossing was scheduled to take 24 hours. In the summer of 2019, this service was provided using the ship Volcán de Timanfaya.

Fleet
Naviera Armas operates a fleet of eleven ferries and five fast ferries. The fast ferries were acquired as a response to competition from rival Canary Islands ferry company Fred. Olsen Express, which operates an entirely high speed fleet.

Not all of the ships operated by Armas are owned by the company. Those owned by Armas follow the company's naming convention: "Volcán de" followed by a name starting with the letter T.

Photo gallery

References

External links

  Official Website
  Ferry Website displaying info on the firm: Simplon PC

Ferry companies of Spain
Ferry companies of Portugal
Transport in the Canary Islands
Companies of the Canary Islands